Steven Michael Fulop (born February 28, 1977) is an American politician serving as the 49th and current mayor of Jersey City, New Jersey. A Democrat, he was formerly the Councilman for Jersey City's Ward E. On May 14, 2013, Fulop defeated incumbent mayor Jerramiah Healy.

Fulop assumed the office of mayor on July 1, 2013. He was widely considered likely to run for governor in 2017, but ended this speculation by announcing his intention to run for re-election as mayor. In November 2017, Mayor Fulop was re-elected as mayor of Jersey City with 78% of the vote which represented the largest margin of re-election by a Jersey City mayor since 1949. He was again re-elected in 2021, becoming the first Jersey City mayor to win a third term since Frank Hague. On January 3, 2023, Fulop announced that he will not seek reelection in 2025.

Early life
Fulop was born in Edison, New Jersey, to Jewish parents, Carmen and Arthur Fulop.  His parents were both born in Romania. His father grew up in Israel and was a sniper in the Golani Brigade during the Six-Day War. He owned a delicatessen in Newark, New Jersey, where Fulop often worked, and his mother Carmen, the daughter of Holocaust survivors, worked in an immigration services office helping others gain citizenship. Through the sixth grade, Fulop attended Rabbi Pesach Raymon Yeshiva, an Orthodox Jewish elementary school in Highland Park, New Jersey, though he himself was not observant. For his last two years of elementary school and his first two years of high school, Fulop attended Solomon Schechter Day School of Essex and Union (now Golda Och Academy) in West Orange, New Jersey.

Fulop graduated from J. P. Stevens High School. He went to Harpur College at Binghamton University where he graduated in 1999. During university, he spent time abroad studying at Oxford University in England. In 2006 he completed both his Master of Business Administration at the New York University Stern School of Business and his Master of Public Administration at Columbia University School of International and Public Affairs.

Career

Finance and military service
Upon graduating from college, Fulop joined Goldman Sachs, the investment banking firm, first working in Chicago and later in downtown Manhattan and Jersey City. After seeing first hand the effects of the September 11 attacks, he decided to put his career at Goldman Sachs on hold and join the United States Marine Corps.

Shortly after completion of Marine Corps boot camp, on January 14, 2003, his reserve unit was activated, and Fulop was deployed to Iraq, where he served as part of the 6th Engineer Support Battalion for six months. He traveled into Baghdad in the early weeks of the war. The battalion focused on engineering, logistics, water purification, and fuel, part of the support infrastructure that allowed swift movement through Iraq.  His unit was written about in numerous periodicals during the war, which highlighted the company's movements, their contributions to the war, and the challenges that they encountered. The New Jersey Star Ledger highlighted Fulop on several occasions as a result of his choice to leave his financial services job to serve his country.

After his service in Iraq, Fulop returned to Goldman Sachs. In early 2006, he left Goldman Sachs to take a position at Sanford C. Bernstein & Co., and also completed his service to the Marine Corps Reserve with a rank of Corporal.

Politics
Then-Governor Chris Christie's muscling of New Jersey's leaders to support his political campaign was exposed by Fulop. Christie's subsequent retaliation against Fulop led to actions that became known as Bridgegate.

Campaign for Congress
Fulop ran unsuccessfully for Congress in 2004 against current U.S. Senator Bob Menendez, who then represented New Jersey's  Congressional District; Fulop lost the June 8, 2004 primary election by 74.8 percentage points, 87.4%–12.6%.

City Council election
In May 2005, Fulop was the winner against an incumbent councilman in Jersey City's Ward E, representing the downtown area. When Fulop was sworn into office at 28 years old, he was the youngest member of the city council by more than 17 years and the third youngest in the nearly 200-year existence of the city. However, as noted by The New York Times, the most significant difference between Fulop and every elected official in Jersey City, and most in Hudson County, is that he won the election with no establishment support, beating an incumbent with the backing of Senator Robert Menendez, Mayor Jerramiah Healy of Jersey City, and the Hudson County Democratic organization.

Fulop was outspent by more than 2-to-1 during the campaign but several tactical innovations that were highlighted in The Star-Ledger, The New York Times, and The Jersey Journal contributed to Fulop's win against stiff opposition.

In May 2009, Fulop was re-elected for a second term with 63% of the vote.  In 2012, the Hudson Reporter named him #4 in its list of Hudson County's 50 most influential people.

Legislation
As a councilman, one of Fulop's main interests was ethics reform. In September 2007, he proposed legislation that would have restricted use of city vehicles and property, banned officials from holding multiple elected or appointed positions in government, instituted business and income transparency requirements for elected officials and barred people from lobbying an entity in which they serve. This legislation was rejected by a 6–1–1 vote. Fulop then proposed that Jersey City voters have the opportunity to institute new ethics reform measures by voting on two referendums. The first referendum would prevent elected officials or government employees from collecting more than one taxpayer-financed salary, a practice known as double dipping. By state law, one cannot stop an individual from serving multiple government positions by popular vote, but since state law allows a municipality to hold back a paycheck and benefits if voted on by referendum, it is possible to change the pay structures at the local level to ensure that there is less incentive to collect multiple paychecks and pensions. The second referendum would make it illegal for any entity that does business with the city, such as a developer or contractor, to make a political contribution to a local candidate for a one-year period. This would prohibit those with a specific interest in controlling a singular aspect of local government from bankrolling a local elected official who may have the power to influence that specific interest.

Political prospects
After his election to a second council term, Fulop was expected by some to run for mayor in 2013. In 2010 a Fulop-backed slate won all three open seats on the Board of Education. In September 2016 Fulop endorsed former rival Phil Murphy for governor, opting to run for his second mayoral term.

Mayor 
On May 14, 2013, Fulop beat sitting mayor Jerramiah T. Healy by 15 percentage points, 53%–38%, to become the 49th mayor of Jersey City. Fulop took office on July 1, 2013, with a vision to make Jersey City the "best mid-sized city in the country". Due to a healthy population growth rate combined with a significant increase in residential construction, Fulop has asserted that Jersey City will overtake Newark, New Jersey, to become the largest city in New Jersey, possibly as early as late 2016.

With a reputation as a reformer during his tenure as councilman, he ran for mayor on a platform that promised to transform local government, make the city safer for residents, expand programs and services, and stabilize taxes. He also set out to make Jersey City the destination of choice, in lieu of the suburbs, for the young urbanites and new families moving from Manhattan.

Within his first 100 days in office, Fulop introduced and passed legislation that merged the Police and Fire Departments as well as the Office of Emergency Management into one central department – the Department of Public Safety. This consolidation is projected to create significant savings for Jersey City by eliminating duplicative administrative costs. Fulop's newly created department was also charged with increasing diversity in both the police and fire department by revising its recruitment and retention efforts, emphasizing that members on the force should be representative of the city they serve.  Fulop also increased the size of the police force from 778 uniformed officers upon assuming office to a projected 840 by June 2014.

In an effort to provide transparent and accessible government for the residents of Jersey City, Fulop established (through Executive Order) Jersey City's first Citizen Public Safety Advisory Review Board. This board is charged with making programmatic, legislative, and training recommendations to improve public safety overall. Acknowledging the need for local government to be more responsive to constituents' needs, Fulop overhauled the division of government responsible for handling requests made by citizens, formerly called the "Mayor's Action Bureau", into the "Residents Response Center", adding more representatives and expanding the hours. Fulop's administration expanded the use of technology and social media for easier access and connectivity to constituent services.

Fulop initiated plans to invest nearly $6 million in city parks in 2014 alone, which tripled the annual number of parks projects by renovating 13 parks throughout Jersey City and provided funding for the accelerated construction of Berry Lane Park, an ambitious project that will ultimately transform more than 17 acres of property in to a recreational amenity in the heart of the Bergen-Lafayette community.

Fulop's campaign platform included plans for revitalizing the inner city and creating an environment that would also benefit long-term residents by incentivizing development away from the waterfront and into the heart of the inner city. These campaign platform promises materialized into a Tiered tax abatement policy, the first of its kind in Jersey City, which created a mechanism for future development in parts of Jersey City historically ignored by major developers and development projects.

In an effort to revitalize the Journal Square business district of Jersey City, in February 2014 Fulop released a request for proposals for the restoration, renovation, and professional management of the historic Loew's Jersey Theatre.

In 2011, Jersey City was ranked by Atlantic Magazine as the 10th most artistic city in America, and NerdWallet.com ranked Jersey City the second most diverse city in the United States. Jersey City hosted both Super Bowl XLVIII teams. Fulop launched a branding campaign with the goal of making Jersey City a premier destination for work and play.

The Fulop administration's first municipal budget, presented and introduced in March 2014, reduced property taxes by 2.1 percent and provided the City Council flexibility to reduce taxes even further – up to 5.6 percent. This budget not only reflected the largest total investment in the Department of Recreation for Jersey City within the last five years and the largest percent increase in funding since 1999, but allocated the largest investment in parks in decades. He launched a Jersey City Mural Arts Program, which has facilitated the painting of dozens of murals throughout Jersey City that reflect the diverse communities found within the city. Fulop launched a new prisoner re-entry program within the expanded Jersey City Employment and Training Program (JCETP) under the leadership of former New Jersey Governor Jim McGreevey. The Jersey City Employment and Training Program has received State and Federal funding and is the strongest program of its kind in New Jersey.

In September 2013 (within three months of assuming office), Fulop signed a bill requiring paid sick leave for employees in Jersey City. This legislation makes Jersey City the first city in New Jersey and the sixth city nationally to pass this type of legislation. Fulop aggressively advocated for this policy and worked with the municipal council for its passage citing it as a basic human dignity issue that builds upon the principle that a healthy employee is a more productive employee. The legislation garnered national attention and cemented his reputation as a progressive leader and supporter of working families.

In September 2015, Jersey City launched Citi Bike, a bike-sharing program. Citi Bike was specifically chosen for Jersey City because it was already used in New York City, and the systems are connected.

Jersey City recently launched United Rescue, an emergency medical first-responder program that leverages citizen volunteers and GPS mobile app-based technology to reduce emergency response times for ambulatory calls, and is expected to make Jersey City EMS response time the fastest in the country. In October 2015 Jersey City officially legalized Airbnb, even while cities like New York resist the homesharing service. Fulop has also been a proponent of using data to make government more transparent and accountable, launching a data portal in October 2015 making available a wide range of information about Jersey City and utilizing data mapping and visualization tools to make the information meaningful.

Fulop has been a strong supporter of LGBT rights, officiating at a historic midnight wedding ceremony the night it was officially legalized in New Jersey. Jersey City, which has one of the largest LGBT populations in the state, has received a perfect score of 100 from the Human Rights Campaign's Municipal Equality Index during every year of Fulop's administration, up from 83 in 2012 and better than anywhere else in New Jersey. In September 2015 Jersey City became the first city in the state to expand healthcare coverage to transgender municipal employees.

In February 2016, Fulop signed an executive order making Jersey City the first city in New Jersey to provide a $15 minimum wage for all city employees.

In May 2018, Fulop opposed subsidies for a troubled real estate project run by the Kushner family. The family had requested a 30-year tax break and approximately $9 million in city-issued bonds from Jersey City.

On March 16, 2020, Fulop issued an order requiring that the Jersey City Newport Centre and Hudson Mall shopping centers be closed for an indeterminate period due to the COVID-19 pandemic. The next day, New Jersey Governor Phil Murphy, backed this temporary closure and ordered all malls in New Jersey to temporarily close as well.

On January 3, 2023, Fulop announced that he will not seek reelection for a fourth term in 2025.

Other
Prior to his election on the municipal council, Fulop served as president of the Downtown Coalition of Neighborhood Associations (DCNA) in Jersey City, and as president of The Historic Paulus Hook Association. He has served on the boards of the Columbia University Alumni Association and the Learning Community Charter School in Jersey City. In 2010, he led grassroots and local government efforts to oppose the construction of a gas pipeline through downtown Jersey City. Fulop is a member of Mayors Against Illegal Guns Coalition.

Controversies

Katyń Memorial
In May 2018, Fulop planned to remove the Katyń Massacre Memorial monument located at Exchange Place in Jersey City, New Jersey. Speaker of the Polish Senate Stanisław Karczewski criticized the plan to remove the monument, calling it "scandalous". Fulop publicly attacked Karczewski on Twitter, saying:

In early May 2018, Holocaust survivor Edward Mosberg co-signed a letter asking Fulop not to remove the Katyń Memorial from Exchange Place in the city, writing: "The memory of the Katyn massacre is an important part of the memory and memories of the Holocaust and we encourage you to reconsider your decision to remove this monument."

The plans to remove the monument were criticized by Polish officials and Jewish community leaders in Poland. Polish media claimed that the removal plans were revenge for the Act on the Institute of National Remembrance that criminalized blaming Poland for Holocaust atrocities.

The issue was resolved on December 20, 2018, when the nine-member Jersey City Council voted unanimously to adopt an ordinance that the monument remain where it stands in Exchange Place "in perpetuity".

Inclusionary Zoning Ordinance
In October 2020, Fulop backed an Inclusionary Zoning Ordinance (or IZO) in Jersey City, New Jersey. Councilmember-at-Large Rolando Lavarro offered critiqued the initial ordinance, mentioning that the ordinance "has too much flexibility and too many avenues out." The Councilmember then attempted to make amendments to the IZO, to no result the council voted against such amendments (2-4-2, Aye Lavarro, Solomon. Nay Robinson, Saleh, Rivera, Watterman. Abstain Ridley, Prinz-Arey, Boggiano).

At the public meeting to vote on the IZO, 4 hours of public comments spoke against the measure except for one resident. "The ordinance as proposed would be one of the weakest, if not the weakest housing ordinances in New Jersey." said Fair Share Housing Center attorney Bassam Gergi. Despite this, the measure passed 7-2 (Aye Ridley, Saleh, Prinz-Arey, Rivera, Boggiano, Robinson, Watterman. Nay Lavarro, Solomon).

In December 2020, Fair Share Housing Center sued Jersey City, New Jersey to overturn the IZO.

In August 2021, Hudson County, New Jersey Presiding Judge Joseph A. Turula ruled that Jersey City, New Jersey officials had violated New Jersey's Municipal Land Use Law when they rushed to adopt it without first referring it to the city's Planning Board for review, therefore the IZO would be thrown out.

Waste Collection Tax
In January 2021, the Jersey City Municipal Utilities Authority enacted a fee of $1.92 per 100 cubic feet of water to go towards the city's $15.1 million garbage and recycling contract with Elizabeth-based Regional Industries, Inc. The fee, while covering solid waste pickup, was to be calculated based on each home and businesses' water usage, with the goal of including tax-abated properties in those to receive bills. The bill was approved in September 2020, the same year Fulop touted no tax increases.

The tax, often touted as a "backdoor tax" by many, was opposed by many residents and businesses, amassing above 1000 signatures. With elections coming up in November 2021, Fulop announced that the city was suspending the fee "until the entire formula is reevaluated." In a press release, he also said "Residents have explained to us that they are being way overcharged on what was supposed to be a nominal fee for their waste collection after these services were acquired by the (Municipal Utilities Authority)."

Personal life
Fulop also owns a second house in Narragansett, Rhode Island, where he claims that he and his family have been "longtime residents". He unsuccessfully lobbied the town council to have public parking banned on the street where his house is located.

Steven is an avid endurance athlete completing several marathons as well as a full Ironman Championship in 2012 finishing in a time of 11 hours and 58 minutes.

Electoral history

In 2017, Mayor Fulop was re-elected with over 77 percent of the vote, the largest plurality since 1947.

See also

References
Notes

External links

1977 births
21st-century American politicians
American people of Israeli descent
American people of Romanian-Jewish descent
Harpur College alumni
Golda Och Academy alumni
Goldman Sachs people
J. P. Stevens High School alumni
Jewish American people in New Jersey politics
Jewish mayors of places in the United States
Living people
Mayors of Jersey City, New Jersey
New Jersey city council members
New Jersey Democrats
New York University Stern School of Business alumni
People from Edison, New Jersey
School of International and Public Affairs, Columbia University alumni
United States Marine Corps non-commissioned officers
United States Marine Corps personnel of the Iraq War
United States Marine Corps reservists